Hasnur Group is an Indonesian conglomerate headquartered in South Jakarta. It was founded by Abdussamad Sulaiman HB in 1966. It has interests in forestry, mining, media, services and an Indonesian professional football team, PS Barito Putera.

Hasnur does most of its business in South Kalimantan, where it is the largest company.

References 

Conglomerate companies of Indonesia
Companies based in Jakarta